The Man They Could Not Hang is a 1939 American horror film directed by Nick Grinde from a screenplay by Karl Brown. It stars Boris Karloff as Dr. Henryk Savaard, a scientist who develops a procedure for bringing the dead back to life. When he is arrested and sentenced to be executed for murdering a young medical student who volunteered to be killed to test the procedure, Savaard vows retribution on the individuals responsible. Alongside Karloff, the film's cast includes Lorna Gray, Robert Wilcox, and Roger Pryor.

The Man They Could Not Hang is the first in a series of four similarly-themed but otherwise unrelated horror films produced by Columbia Pictures, all starring Karloff, informally known as the "Mad Doctor Cycle." It was followed by The Man with Nine Lives, Before I Hang (both 1940), and The Devil Commands (1941). A fifth, The Boogie Man Will Get You (1942), was a parody of the others.

Plot
Dr. Henryk Savaard is a scientist experimenting with bringing the dead back to life in a laboratory in his home. Bob Roberts, a young medical student, volunteers himself to be temporarily killed in order to test an artificial heart developed by Savaard. If successful, Savaard's invention could allow doctors to perform procedures that would otherwise be impossible to conduct on living patients. Bob's fiancée, Ms. Crawford, fears that the experiment will fail, and rushes to a police department to alert law enforcement. When the police enter Savaard's house, Savaard instructs his assistant, Lang, to take the artificial heart and hide. Despite his assertions that he can restore Bob's life, the police arrest Savaard for murder.

After a publicized trial, a jury declares Savaard guilty of first-degree murder, and he is sentenced to hang. Following the announcement of the verdict, the presiding Judge Bowman allows Savaard two minutes to speak, which Savaard uses to condemn those responsible for his conviction. On death row, Savaard is visited by Lang, and signs a release form that will allow Lang to take possession of his body after he is executed. Shortly thereafter, Savaard is hanged.

Some time later, Savaard is revived by Lang. Though he sustained a broken neck from the hanging, Lang was able to surgically repair it, an effort that Lang notes would have been unfeasible had Savaard been alive. Over the month following Savaard's execution, six of the jurors from his trial are found hanged in apparent suicides, a commonality noticed by reporter 'Scoop' Foley. Foley visits Savaard's house on a night when the surviving jurors—along with District Attorney Drake, Police Lieutenant Shane, and police surgeon Dr. Stoddard—have been asked to gather there, having been sent messages attributed to Judge Bowman. When Bowman arrives, he reveals that he received a telegram supposedly signed by Savaard's daughter Janet asking him to meet her there.

As the guests attempt to deduce who summoned them to the location, Savaard enters the room. Inviting them to stay for dinner, he explains to his guests, who are stunned to see him alive, that he could kill all of them and be protected by the alibi of his being legally dead. Judge Bowman tries to leave the house but is fatally electrocuted when he attempts to open a grille separating the guests from the house's front doors. Savaard disappears, and the remaining guests realize that they are trapped in the house.

Over an intercom, Savaard announces that each of them will be killed at fifteen-minute intervals. Kearney, the head juror, is killed when he answers a phone that thrusts a poison-tipped needle into his ear, piercing his brain. Savaard states that Ms. Crawford is next to die. Janet arrives at the house, and the trapped guests explain to her that her father is alive. Janet finds Savaard upstairs in his laboratory, and implores him to abandon his desire for revenge. Savaard reveals that he killed Lang after Lang threatened to expose his plan to kill those responsible for convicting him. Janet heads downstairs and, in spite of her father's pleas, purposefully touches the electrified grille, forcing Savaard to surrender.

Using Savaard's artificial heart apparatus, Dr. Stoddard revives Janet. Savaard, to the dismay of Dr. Stoddard, destroys his invention with a gun, and dies.

Cast

Stanley Brown appears in an uncredited role as Bob Roberts.

Production notes

The fictional heart-and-lung-machine prop presented an idea that was strictly science fiction at the time, but later the central idea became reality as "open-heart surgery." Later renamed "on-pump" surgery owing to the development of microsurgery that does not require stopping the heart, "on pump" requires heart stoppage, then hook-up to the pump, then operating on the repairs, and then reconnecting and reviving the patient, exactly the basic theory presented by the film.

Critical reception
On review aggregator website Rotten Tomatoes, the film has an approval rating of 67% based on six reviews, with an average rating of 6.8/10.

Home media
In the 1990s, The Man They Could Not Hang was released on VHS by RCA/Columbia Pictures Home Video. In 2006, the film was included on a four-film DVD release titled "Icons of Horror Collection: Boris Karloff", accompanying The Black Room (1935), Before I Hang (1940), and The Boogie Man Will Get You (1942). In 2021, The Man They Could Not Hang was released on Blu-ray in Region B by Eureka Entertainment, as part of a six-film box set known as "Karloff at Columbia". The other films included in the set are The Black Room, The Man with Nine Lives, Before I Hang, The Devil Commands, and The Boogie Man Will Get You.

See also
 Boris Karloff filmography
 John Babbacombe Lee, also known as "The Man They Could Not Hang"

References

Bibliography

External links

 
 
 

1939 films
American black-and-white films
Columbia Pictures films
1930s English-language films
Films directed by Nick Grinde
1930s science fiction horror films
American science fiction horror films
1930s horror thriller films
1930s thriller films
1939 horror films
Transhumanism in film
1930s American films